Sappho (died ) was an ancient Greek poet.

Sappho may also refer to:

Arts and entertainment
Sappho (painting), an 1890s art piece by Ernst Stückelberg
Sappho (play), an 1818 tragedy by Franz Grillparzer
Sappho (film), a 1921 German silent film starring Pola Negri
Sapho ou La fureur d'aimer,  1971 French film with Marina Vlady and Renaud Verley
Sappho, a 1963 opera by Peggy Glanville-Hicks

Organisations
Sappho (organisation), a lesbian social group in the United Kingdom
Sappho for Equality, an LGBT rights campaign group in East India

Other people with the name
Sappho Leontias (1832–1900), Greek writer

Places
Sappho, Washington, an unincorporated community in the United States
Sappho Point, a headland on the island of South Georgia

Science
Sappho (bird), a hummingbird genus
80 Sappho, a stony, main-belt asteroid

Ships
 – one of several mercantile vessels
 – one of five vessels of the British Royal Navy, or two planned vessels
 – either of two vessels of the United States Navy

See also
Saffo (disambiguation)
Sapho (disambiguation)
Sapphic (disambiguation)